Trandafiru is a Romanian fairy tale collected by Arthur Carl Victor Schott and Albert Schott in the mid-19th century and sourced from Banat.

It is related to the international cycle of the Animal as Bridegroom or The Search for the Lost Husband, albeit with a gourd instead of a snake as the form of the enchanted husband. Another Romanian tale of the same classification is The Enchanted Pig, wherein the animal husband is a pig.

Summary
A man has a gourd for a son, who is a vegetable by day and man by night, named Trandafiru. One day, the gourd asks his parents to go and ask for the hand of the emperor's daughter. Worried about the reaction of the emperor when they see a pumpkin, the gourd son assuages their fears and becomes a man when night falls, so he can meet the princess. And so it happens: the emperor's daughter marries him and lives with him, despite him being a gourd by day and a man by night.

One day, the princess's mother visits her daughter and, despising the gourd as her son-in-law, convinces her to burn the gourd shape in the oven. The princess's mother-in-law asks her what is she doing with the oven, and she lies that she is preparing to make bread, then takes her husband's gourd shape and places it in the oven to burn it. Inside the oven, Trandafiru's voice curses his wife not to give birth to their child, until he lovingly embraces her again. The story then explains that, as the gourd burned, Trandafiru's soul was carried over by spirits to another kingdom, where he became their king.

Back to the princess, after grieving for some time, she puts an iron circle around her belly to endure the pains of the long pregnancy, then departs on her quest. Her first stop is the house of Holy Mother Wednesday, who, despite not knowing the location of Trandafiru, gives the princess a golden distaff and sends her to the house of Mother Holy Friday. Again, Holy Friday's help is of little use, but she gives the princess a golden reel to help in her quest. Lastly, the princess arrives at Holy Mother Sunday's house. Holy Mother Sunday tells the princess she is near her husband's location, and advises her to stand by the marble fountain with the golden gifts, one for each day, and draw the attention of the Empress (the false bride), then use the gifts to bribe the Empress for a night in the Emperor's (Trandafiru's) bedchamber. Before the princess goes to the fountain, Holy Mother Sunday gives her a golden hen with golden chicks.

Now knowing what to do, the princess goes to the fountain and uses the gifts to bribe the Empress for three nights with her husband. As for Trandafiru, he is put to sleep for two nights with a sleeping potion given by the Empress, so on the third night he pretends to be asleep to see who has come to his room for the past nights. Trandafiru awakes and embraces his wife, who is able to give birth to "two golden children". Trandafiru leaves the room to punish the Empress for her greed and love for gold, then crowns the princess his true empress.

Analysis

Tale type
The tale is classified in the Aarne-Thompson-Uther Index as type ATU 425A, "The Animal (Monster) as Bridegroom". In this tale type, the princess burns the husband's animal skin and she must seek him out, even paying a visit to the Sun, the Moon and the Wind and gaining their help.

In tale type ATU 425A, the heroine journeys far and wide to encounter her husband, and finds him at the mercy of a second spouse. The supernatural husband, now human, is put to sleep by the magic potion of the second spouse, so that the heroine has no chance of rescuing him.

Motifs

The heroine's pregnancy 
In Balkanic variants of the tale type, the supernatural husband curses his wife not to give birth to their child for a long period of time until she finds him again. In addition, according to Lithuanian professor , similar tales from Hungary, Romania and Moldova contain the motif of the supernatural husband wrapping iron hoops around the heroine's belly so she cannot give birth to their child until he lays a hand on her again.

The heroine's journey
According to Hungarian folklorist Ágnes Kovács, Romanian tales of the "Snake Bridegroom" may show two versions (or redactions): either the mother-in-law burns the man's snakeskin, but he stays with his human bride, or the snakeskin is burnt and the husband disappears. The latter sequence prompts the husband's curse of the long pregnancy and the wife's quest for her husband.

In a study published posthumously, Romanian folklorist  noted that, in Romanian and in some South Slavic variants, instead of meeting the Sun, the Moon and the Wind on the way to her husband, the heroine finds incarnations of the days of the week, like Holy Wednesday (ro) and Holy Friday (ro). They function the same as the elements and gift the heroine with golden objects.

The gifts from the helpers
According to Hans-Jörg Uther, the main feature of tale type ATU 425A is "bribing the false bride for three nights with the husband". In fact, when he developed his revision of Aarne-Thompson's system, Uther remarked that an "essential" trait of the tale type ATU 425A was the "wife's quest and gifts" and "nights bought".

Jean Boutière also wrote that the heroine's three helpers (the days of the week) gift her with golden objects (one gift from each helper): a self-moving distaff, a self-moving reel and a hen with chicks - objects that, he noted, are "endowed with movement".

Other motifs
The compilers stated that the hero's name, Trandafiru, translated to "rose" or "rose blossom".

Variants

Romania

Tales with pumpkin husband 
Romanian folklorist Lazar Saineanu provided the summary of a Romanian tale collected by Petre Ispirescu with the title Dovleacul cel năzdrăvan ("The Enchanted Pumpkin"). In this tale, a childless couple find a pumpkin seed and plant it. A pumpkin sprouts and they uproot it. The vegetable begins to speak to them and asks the old man to go to the local emperor and ask for the princess's hand in marriage. The emperor agrees to a future marriage, so long as the suitor builds three bridges: an iron one, a silver one and the third made of gold. The pumpkin son fulfills the emperor's requests and marries the princess. On the wedding night, the pumpkin takes off its husk and becomes a human youth. Later, the princess burns the pumpkin husk in the fire and her hsband curses her not to give birth until he places his hand on her body, but she can only find him beyond Câmpu-frumosŭ, in the "Mânăstirea dintr'unŭ osŭ". He vanishes. The princess goes after him in iron shoes and with an iron cane, and passes by the houses of Sfinta Miercuri (Holy Wednesday), who gives her a self-moving golden spindle, Sfinta Vineri (Holy Friday), who gives her a golden hen with chicks, and Sfinta Duminecă (Holy Sunday), who gives her a self-serving table. Sfinta Duminecă also helps the princess to cross a fiery meadow, so she can reach the Mânăstirea dintr'unŭ osŭ, where she waits in front of the palace the golden objects. The princess trades the items she gained with the local lady of the palace for one night with her husband. She tries to wake him up on the first two nights, but fails, only managing to do it on the third night.

Sandu Timoc collected another tale from a teller in Vidin, with the title Dovletele ("The Pumpkin"). In this tale, a poor couple, in their twilight years, want to have a son, so the man decides to bring whatever they can find as their child. The man finds a pumpkin seed, brings it home and plants it. After some time, a pumpkin sprouts in their garden, and the man kicks it. The pumpkin tells the man not to kick it, but to take it home and raise it as their son. Some time later, the pumpkin tells his parents he wants to marry the emperor's daughter. The old man goes to the emperor and makes a bid in for his daughter in his son's stead, and the emperor orders him to build a bridge between both their houses, with golden and silver trees along the path, and ripe apples on them. The pumpkin son fulfills the first task. To buy time, the emperor next orders for a shining palace to be built that can rival his own, and for the old man's son to come in a gem-encrusted golden carriage with golden wheels, pulled by splendid horses with golden horsehoes and diamond bridle. All tasks fulfilled, the pumpkin son marries the princess. They move out to the pumpkin's palace and, after he enters the bridal chambers, the pumpkin son becomes a golden-haired youth. He tells his wife a witch cureed him to become a pumpkin by day and a man named Fat-Frumos at night. Later, the princess tells her mother about her husband. The empress suggests her daughter takes the pumpkin husk and burn it in the oven. The princess follows her mother's suggestion and places the pumpkin in the fire. As the husk burns, the husband tells her that his curse would have been over in nine days, and now he curses his wife not to give birth to their child until he touches her again. He vanishes. The princess puts a large iron ring around her belly and begins her quest. She passes by Sinta Vineri (Holy Friday), who gives her a golden hen with six chicks and directs her to Sinta Simbata (Holy Saturday). The princess  goes to Sinta Simbata, who gives her a golden spindle and guides her to Sinta Duminica (Holy Sunday). At last, she reaches Sinta Duminica, who is grinding grains by a mill, and tells the princess her husband is living with a new spouse in a nearby village in the valley. Sinta Duminica advises the princess to go to the village well, where the princess goes to fetch water, and use the golden gifts to draw her attention. Following the advice, the princess uses the three golden gifts to bribe for three nights with her husband. On the third night, the princess awakens her husband and he touches her. The princess gives birth to their child. The husband regains his memories and tells the second spouse about the whole journey. The second spouse understands it and lets them live in the village.

Tales with snake husband 
Romanian folklorist  collected a variant titled Şarpele moşului ("The Old Man's Serpent") from informant Ion Georgescu. In this tale, a poor old couple wants to have a son, so the man chooses to find any creature to adopt as a son. The man finds a serpent with a human face and adopts it as his son. After 15 years, the human-faced serpent begins to talk to his parents and explains he is an enchanted prince. Some time later, he wants to marry the local king's daughter. The king orders the serpent suitor to some pre-marriage tasks: to build an iron bridge, a silver bridge and a golden bridge between the old couple's hut and the palace. The serpent suitor advises her adoptive father on how to summon magical help from other snake servants to build the bridges. After fulfilling the tasks, the princess marries the serpent. On their wedding night, the serpent takes off his nine snakeskins and becomes human, but in the morning he wears them again. After a year, the king tells his daughter to burn the snakeskins in an oven. The serpent husband sees his wife preparing the oven and she tells him she will bake bread. That night, while husband is asleep, she takes the snakeskins into the oven. The husband wakes up and curses his wife not to give birth to their child, until she wears out iron garments, and three iron circles around her belly fall out. He disappears. The princess, pregnant, goes after him. On the way, she meets the incarnation of Saint Monday (Sfintei Luni), who gives her a golden hen with golden chicks, and tells her that down in a ravine a man lives with a fairy woman. She goes to the place at the ravine and tries to wake her husband up, but to no avail. She then meets the incarnation of Holy Friday (Sfânta Vineri), who gives her a golden boar to trade for her husband. Once again, she fails. Lastly, she goes to the incarnation of the Holy Saturday (Sfânta Sâmbătă), who gives her two golden pigeons. She gives the pigeons to the fairy woman and enters her husband's quarters to awaken him. He wakes up and touches her wife, and releases her from the iron circles around her belly.

Writer and folklorist Cristea Sandu Timoc collected a Romanian variant from teller Lăpădat Maria and published it with the title Dinu Făt-Frumos. In this tale, a childless couple suffers for having no son. Out of desperation, they agree to take the first creature they find as their son. The old man finds a snake and brings it home. The couple raises the snake son until he grows up, and, one day, he tells them he wants to marry the princess. He asks his mother to go to the king's court and propose to her in his name. The king scoffs at the proposal and tells her that her son must perform some tasks first: to pave the way with gold and silver overnight and to build a place more splendid that the king's. The snake son does and he marries the princess. At night, the snake son takes off his snakeskin and becomes a man, to the princess's delight, but slithers back into the snakeskin at dawn. This goes on for some time, until, one night, the princess heats off the oven to burn her husband's snakeskin. He wakes up, scolds her and beats her nose, drawing three drops of blood. He then curses her: the three drops of blood shall remain so, and she cannot give birth to their child until he returns to her in nine years' time, and vanishes. Time passes, and her belly grows so large with each passing year, she attaches an iron ring around it, one for each year. She decides to go after him and asks the Sun and the Wind for directions. God takes pity on her and gives her three golden items: a golden hen with five golden chicks, a golden spinning wheel and a golden yarn. The Wind carries her to the palace of the Fairy Empress. The Fairy Empress sees the three golden objects and wants them, but the princess exchanges each one for one night with her husband. On the first two nights, the man does not wake up, but she insists and he wakes up. The man puts his hand on her belly and their child is born.

In a tale from Siebenbürgen, published by author  in German language magazine Das Ausland with the title Von der Schlange, die ein Weib gebar ("About the Snake that a Woman gave birth to"), a couple that have been together for 20 years long for a child. One day, the woman passes by a garden and smells a flower. She becomes pregnant and gives birth to a snake, which she feeds with milk. After 10 years, the snake - the size of a balaur - asks his parents to ask for the hand of the emperor's daughter in marriage. The princess asks for her suitor to build a palace, with fruitful trees along side a road between both palaces. The snake fulfills the task and marries the princess. On the wedding night, he takes off his snakeskin and becomes a prince. Time passes, and the princess takes off the snakeskin to burn it in the oven. The snakeskin is burnt, and her husband curses the princess not to give birth to their child until he places his hand on her again, then some iron rings involve her belly. The snake son (now human) disappears and works for another king as a cowherd. He takes the cows to graze in a forest that belongs to a Zmeu, which attacks him. The cowherd defests the zmeu and gains the king's favour and the hand of the king's daughter. At the same court, the princess (the Emperor's daughter), who has been searching for her husband for 20 years, recognizes him and goes to his room at night, to plead for him to touch her belly so she can give birth to their son. The man awakes and touches her.

Romanian folklorist Lazăr Șăineanu summarized another Transylvanian tale titled Ficiorul moşului or Feciorulǔ Moşului ("Old Man's Son"). In this tale, an old woman raises a snake child. When he is of age, he asks for the princess's hand in marriage. They marry. On the wedding night, the snake man takes off the snakeskin and becomes a human man. The princess takes the snakeskin and burns, but her husband curses her not to give birth to their child until he places his hand on her, and iron rings spring around her belly. She begins her long quest, and is helped by St. Miercuri (Holy Wednesday), who gives her a shirt made of cobwebs; by St. Veneri (Holy Friday), who gives her a fuse of golden threads, and by St. Dumineca (Holy Sunday), who gives her a bag of cobwebs. The princess, heavily pregnant, finds her husband as a servant, working under Muma Padurii, a witch that lives in the forest. The princess bribes Mama Padurii to talk to her husband, and manages to make him remember. According to Romanian scholarship, the tale was printed in political publication , by one Oreste.

Saineanu summarized a third Transylvanian tale titled Uitatulă  or Uitatul (German: "Das Vergessene"; English: "The Forgotten One"). In this tale, an Emperor goes to war, and asks his three daughters what gifts he can find for them. The elder asks for a pair of earrings, the middle one a ring, and the third a flower unlike any other seen between Heaven and Earth. The emperor wins the war and finds the presents for his elder daughters, but forgets the youngest's. He reaches a castle with an enchanted garden, where he finds the flower. However, a large dragon's head ("unŭ capŭ de balaurŭ") appears to him and demands the emperor gives up his youngest daughter to "Uitatul". The youngest daughter goes to Uitatulă and lives with him. She discovers he takes off his scales to becomes a handsome man. One day, she decides to burn the dragon scales. The human husband admonishes her that in three days time he would have been free from the curse, but now has to vanish, and curses his wife not to give birth to their child until he places his hands on her again. The princess ties iron rings around her belly and walks with an iron cane. She meets St. Luni (Holy Monday), who gives her golden tableware (two forks and a spoon); St. Miercuri (Holy Wednesday), who gives her two golden apples; and St. Vineri (Holy Friday), who gives her a golden chicken with 12 chicks. She also learns her husband is set to be married to another empress, and is advised to use the gifts the women gave her to lure the Empress. The princess uses the golden gifts to bribe the Empress for three nights with her husband, and manages to wake him on the third night. Her husband awakens and touches her belly, finally releasing her from her long pregnancy.

In a Romanian tale from Transylvania published in "Gazeta de Transilvania" with the title Ginŭ Costanginŭ, an old couple have three sons and three daughters, but their children die, leaving only a daughter named Safta. The old woman blames God, but He gives her a snake for a son. The old couple name him Ginŭ Costanginŭ, and raise him in secret. In time, the snake son grows so large his parents have to move him out to a shed. The snake son falls in love with a local maiden named Mărgeluţa, daughter of the local rich lord Mihia. The snake declares he will marry only Mărgeluţa and no one else, and his father goes to Mihai's house with the proposition. Mihai refuses to marry his daughter to a snake, unless he builds an iron bridge between their houses. The snake son fulfills his request and marries Mărgeluţa. On the wedding night, Ginŭ Costanginŭ takes off the snakeskin and becomes a handsome youth at night, but in the morning he wears it again. For two whole years, Ginŭ Costanginŭ and Mărgeluţa live like this, and the girl keeps his secret, until one day Mărgeluţa's mother pays her a visit and tells her about her husband's transformation. Mărgeluţa's mother consults with a priest, who says she should take the snakeskin and burn it. The next time, while her husband is asleep, Mărgeluţa takes the snakeskin and throws it in the fire. Ginŭ Costanginŭ smells the burning and notices his snakeskin is not there, so he curses his wife not to give birth until he touches her belly again, then vanishes. Mărgeluţa blames her mother and the priest, but, after two years, places an iron ring around her swollen belly, and begins to search for her husband. She passes by the houses of Sfânta Mercurĭ (Holy Wednesday), who gives her a self-moving golden distaff, then of Sf. Vinerĭ (Holy Friday), who gives her two golden apples, and finally to the house of sf. Duminecă (Holy Sunday), who gives her a golden hen with chicks. Sf. Duminecă also tells the girl her husband is inside a house near the church, and she is to stay by the fountain with the golden objects to draw the attention of the maidservants. The maidservants report to the mistress of the house about the girl at the fountain with the golden objects. This entices the mistress's curiosity, who brings Mărgeluţa to the house. The girl trades the golden objects for one night with Ginŭ Costanginŭ: she fails on the first two nights, but he wakes up on the third night and places her hand on her belly, allowing her to give birth to their children, a boy and a girl with golden hair. The mistress of the house, however, takes the children and buries them in the garden, and the twins go through a cycle of reincarnations (trees, beds, lambs and humans again). Ginŭ Costanginŭ takes the golden-haired twins to his second spouse's house for a banquet and bids them tell a story. The mistress of the house runs away from the scene, and Ginŭ Costanginŭ finally lives with his wife and children.

Moldova
In a Moldavian tale published by author Grigore Botezatu with the title The Snake-Prince and the King's Daughter, an old couple have no children. One day, the old man decides to venture into the wide world in search of a son for them. He stops by a little well to drink water, and finds that a little snake sneaked into his bag. He brings the snake home to is wife and feeds with milk and nut kernels. After four days, the snake grows so large and asks their parents to find them a wife, the king's daughter. The old man goes to the king to offer his snake's son proposal, but he is beaten and cast out of the castle. The snake son swallows his father to restore his health and, after spitting him out, insists he tries again with the king. The king listens to the proposal, but asks for a task first: to level a mountain into a valley, build a mill in it, then plant wheat, harvest it, grind it into flour, bake bread and deliver it to the king - all of this overnight. The snake son whistles and summons an army of snake servants to fulfill the task for him. The second task is for the sea to beat just below the castle's window, and, on the other side of the sea, for a vineyard to be planted and for the grapes to be ripe just before sunrise. The third task isto build a golden road between the king's castle and the bridegroom's house, with golden bridges, golden trees with golden fruits and singing golden birds. He fulfills the tasks and marries the king's daughter. After the wedding feast, they retire to their new home, and the snake son takes off his snakeskin to reveal he is a human prince beneath it. They live like this for some time, until one day, the queen asks her daughter about her married life. The princess reveals he is a snake by day and a man by night, and the queen suggests she puts some hot coals under his side of the bed, so that, when he stretches his legs, the snakeskin will fall on the coals and burn. The princess follows the instructions and lets the snakeskin burn on the hot coals. The snake youth wakes up and tells that his curse would be undone in three days, then curses his wife to have three iron rings around her maidens girdle, so that she cannot bear their son, and departs. The princess goes after him and meets the Holy Wednesday, who gives her three golden apples; the Holy Friday, who gives her a gold spinning reel, and the Holy Sunday, who gives her a silk handkerchief embroidered with gold. Lastly, she reaches her destination where her husband is to be found: the land of the fairies, a kingdom where the water is blue, the fields are gold and the grass is green. She uses the presents from her helpers to buy three nights in her husband's bed, wakes him and lets him touch the iron rings, so she can give birth to their son.

Romani people
Transylvanian linguist Heinrich von Wlislocki collected and published a tale from the Romani with the title Das Schlangenkind ("The Snake-Child"). In this tale, a poor couple laments not having a son. One day, the woman is fetching firewood in the forest and sees a beautiful flower. She leans down to get it, but the flower is pulled down in the ground. The woman tries to pluck it, but feels that something is pulling it down. The woman lets it be, but mutters to herself that at least she gets to smell it. The woman goes back home and senses she is pregnant. Her husband comments that the event might be the work of a "Phuvush" (Romani language: Pçuvuš, a sort of earth spirit). Nine months later, the woman gives birth to a snake, and the couple decide to shelter it from the world at large by hiding it in a dark room in their house. Twenty years pass, the snake son wishes to see the outside world, but his mother warns him against it since people might hurt or kill him. The snake son tells his mother not to worry: whenever people try to attack him, sparks fly out of the snake's body to injure the people, so he is left alone. Near the couple's house, a widow lives with her daughter, who is kind to the snake son, throwing him apples to feed him. The snake son talks to the girl he wants to marry her, and she answers that she will marry him if he fills her apron with gold. The snake son approaches her and spits gold coins from his mouth into her apron. The girl marries him. On the wedding night, the snake son asks his wife to spit at his mouth three times. The girl obeys; the snake son takes off the snakeskin and becomes a handsome youth. They live like this for a year. The girl, however, decides to burn the snakeskin and keep him in human form for good. One night, she takes the snakeskin and burns it in the oven. The snake husband wakes up and tries to salvage whatever can remain of the snakeskin, but cannot, so he curses his wife not to give birth until he touches her again, as a payback for burning his snakeskin. Metal rings circle her belly, while her husband goes to another village to work as a cowherd for a farmer. The man goes to the margin of the river and thinks about his wife, then spits at the river. A little fish swallows the saliva and swims next to the pregnant wife's house. She catches the fish and cooks it. After she eats the fish, she gives birth to her child. Later, she goes in search of her husband and finds him.

References 

Romanian fairy tales
Fiction about shapeshifting
Male characters in fairy tales
Fictional princes
ATU 400-459